Michel El Khoury (born 24 November 1926) is a Lebanese politician who served as governor of Banque du Liban from 1978 to 1985 and from 1991 to 1993. The son of President Bechara El Khoury, he succeeded him in leading the Constitutional Bloc. He was defense minister from December 1965 to April 1966.

References

External links

1926 births
Living people
Place of birth missing (living people)
Governors of Banque du Liban
Defense ministers of Lebanon
Lebanese Maronites